Coleophora campestriphaga is a moth of the family Coleophoridae. It is found from Germany, the Czech Republic, Slovakia, Austria and Romania.

The larvae feed on Artemisia campestris. They create a light coloured silken tube with some darker length lines caused by detritus particles. Full-grown larvae can be found in March and May.

References

campestriphaga
Moths described in 1980
Moths of Europe